Johannes Justus Rein (27 January 1835 in Raunheim, near Giessen – 23 January 1918 in Bonn) was a German geographer, author and traveler in East Asia. On the title page of 
each of his books, his name is given as either J.J. Rein or Johann J. Rein.

Biography
He was educated in mathematics and science at the University of Giessen. He made various scientific journeys in Europe, Asia, and America, and was appointed professor of geography at the University of Marburg in 1876, and subsequently at Bonn (1883).

Rein spent the first five months of 1874 in Japan, residing in the German Legation in Tokio [Tokyo] and studying lacquer. After submitting a detailed report on the subject, he traveled throughout Japan.

Works
He wrote Japan, nach Reisen und Studien (2 volumes, 1881–86), which was translated into English, under the title, Japan: travels and researches undertaken at the cost of the Prussian government (1884), as was also his book on Japanese industries (1889). Another work was Columbus und seine vier Reisen nach Westen (“Columbus and his four trips to the West,” 1892).

References
 
 

1835 births
1918 deaths
People from Groß-Gerau (district)
University of Giessen alumni
Academic staff of the University of Marburg
Academic staff of the University of Bonn
German geographers
German Japanologists
German male non-fiction writers